This is a list of the NCAA outdoor champions in the hammer throw event.   The event was introduced into the program in 1996.

Champions
Key
A=Altitude assisted

References

GBR Athletics

https://www.ncaa.org/championships/statistics/ncaa-mens-and-womens-outdoor-track-and-field-championships-records-and-results

External links
NCAA Division I women's outdoor track and field

NCAA Women's Division I Outdoor Track and Field Championships
Outdoor track, women
hammer